Saint Peirio was a 6th-century pre-congregational saint of Wales and a child of King Caw of Strathclyde.

Biography 
In 605AD he founded a church at Rhosbeirio on Anglesey Island, North Wales. Writing in 1861, Harry Longueville Jones said of St Peirio's church that it was "one of the humblest ecclesiastical buildings in Anglesey" and  that there were "no architectural features in this church worthy of delineation."

References

Medieval Welsh saints
6th-century Christian saints
5th-century Welsh people
5th-century births
Roman Catholic monks
Welsh Roman Catholic saints
Year of birth unknown
Year of death unknown
Christian female saints of the Middle Ages